Guyruita cerrado is a species of spider in the genus Guyruita. The species has originally been described by José P.L. Guadanucci, Sylvia M. Lucas,  Rafael P. Indicatti and Flávio U. Yamamoto.

Etymology 
The species is named after the Cerrado also known as Brazilian savanna. The genus Guyruita is derived from the Tupi language and means " to go underneath rocks".

Range 
The species has been observed in Central and Northern part of Brazil, specifically, Goiás, Maranhão, Pará, Piauí and Tocantins.

References

Theraphosidae
Spiders of Brazil